"Different Days" may refer to:

Music
 Different Days (L'Altra album), 2005
 Different Days (The Charlatans album), 2017
 "Different Days", a song by Jason Isbell
 "Different Days", a song by The Men